Shallow Bay: The Best of Breaking Benjamin is the first greatest hits album by American rock band Breaking Benjamin, released on August 16, 2011 by Hollywood Records. The album features every single released by the band from 2002's Saturate to 2009's Dear Agony, with the exception of the 2010 digital single version of "Blow Me Away"; instead featuring the remix of that track featuring vocals of Sydnee Duran of Valora. A two-disc deluxe version was released alongside it, featuring remastered versions of B-sides, covers, acoustic performances, live recordings, and other rarities. Shallow Bay debuted at number 22 on the US Billboard 200, and sold an initial 13,700 copies. It topped the US Top Hard Rock Albums chart for three consecutive years, from 2011 to 2013, and also reached number four on the US Top Alternative Albums and US Top Rock Albums charts for 2011.

Despite its name, the track "Shallow Bay" from Saturate does not appear on the album. The 2005 single "Rain" does not appear on the album either, but instead the 2004 studio version of the song which was never released as a single is also featured.

Background and release
In March 2010, Hollywood Records requested that the band produce two new master recordings, sought permission to release a new version of the hit song "Blow Me Away", featuring Sydnee Duran of Valora, and requested the production of Shallow Bay. In May 2011, guitarist Aaron Fink and bassist Mark Klepaski granted the record company's requests after they were offered a $100,000 payment. Burnley, alleging that Fink and Klepaski did not inform him, the band's management, or the band's lawyer, fired the two via email, demanding at least $250,000 in compensatory and punitive damages, as well as the exclusive right to the name "Breaking Benjamin". Fink and Klepaski's attorneys stated the two "dispute and strictly deny" Burnley's allegations, instead asserting that "at issue is the validity of a January 2009 partnership agreement giving Burnley permission to dismiss Fink and Klepaski for 'cause,'" saying that the agreement was no longer valid due to Burnley's status of indefinite hiatus. The case was ordered by a judge to arbitration. Burnley's attorney, Brian Caplan, told the Associated Press, "The relationship between Mr. Burnley and the two other members of the band has ended ... Mr. Burnley intends on moving forward using the name Breaking Benjamin and the band will continue. It just won't continue in its prior configuration. He's not retiring."

In August 2011, Hollywood Records scheduled the release of Shallow Bay, featuring every Breaking Benjamin single released, including the remix of "Blow Me Away". Burnley publicly opposed the album's release, saying content had been altered without his consent and did not meet his standards, refusing to consider it part of the official Breaking Benjamin catalog. The disc received positive critical reception, Loudwire giving the compilation a score of 4 out of 5, with The Daily Trojan praising it for balance and a progressive retrospective history, concluding with "For the first-timers, welcome to Breaking Benjamin."

Track listing

Personnel
 Benjamin Burnley – composer, vocals, guitar
 Aaron Fink – lead guitar
 Mark Klepaski – bass
 Chad Szeliga – drums, percussion 
 Jeremy Hummel – composer, drums, percussion 

 Additional musicians
 David Bendeth – producer, mixing, keyboard, programming
 Billy Corgan – composer, guitar 
 Suzie Catayama – strings arrangement 
 Sydnee Duran – featured vocalist 
 Jonathan "Bug" Price – bass

Chart positions

Album

Singles

References

2011 compilation albums
2011 greatest hits albums
Albums produced by David Bendeth
Breaking Benjamin albums
Hollywood Records compilation albums
Alternative rock compilation albums
Alternative metal compilation albums
Post-grunge compilation albums